Aniela Jaffé (February 20, 1903 – October 30, 1991) was a Swiss analyst who for many years was a co-worker of Carl Gustav Jung. She was the recorder and editor of Jung's semi-autobiographical book Memories, Dreams, Reflections.

Life
Jaffé was born on 20 February 1903 to Jewish parents in Berlin, Germany, where she studied psychology at Hamburg, before fleeing the Nazis in the thirties to Switzerland. There she was analysed first by Liliane Frey and then by Jung, eventually becoming a Jungian analyst herself.

From 1947-1955 she served as secretary to the C. G. Jung Institute in Zurich, before working as Jung's personal secretary from 1955-1961. She continued to provide analyses and dream interpretations into her eighties.

Controversy: Jung's autobiography
Controversy has developed over how responsible Jaffé actually was for Jung's late publication Memories, Dreams, Reflections.  Current thinking would suggest that only the first three chapters of the published work were in fact written by Jung, the remainder being the work of Jaffé herself, if based on her notes of conversations with Jung.

Symbolism and parapsychology 

Jaffé wrote on symbolism in modern art, and explored parapsychological phenomena using Jung's concept of synchronicity as an interpretative tool.

Works

English translation
{{Columns-list|colwidth=30em|
'C. G. Jung and Parapsychology', in J. R. Smythies ed., Science and ESP (2013)
The Myth of Meaning (1970)
Parapsychology, Individuation, Nazism  *From the Life and Work of C. G. Jung (1971)Apparitions and Precognitions (1971)C. G. Jung (1979)C. G. Jung Word And Image (1979)C. G. Jung Memories, Dreams, Reflections, New York: Vintage Books,1961)}}Was C. G Jung A Mystic And Other Essays (1989)

German
 Aus C.G. Jungs letzten Jahren und andere Aufsätze (bisher erschienen unter dem Titel: 'Aufsätze zur Psychologie C.G. Jungs', 1981), 2. Auflage 1987 Daimon Verlag, 
 Bilder und Symbole aus E.T.A. Hoffmanns Märchen „Der goldne Topf“, 1. Auflage 1978 Gerstenberg Verlag, 5. Auflage 2010, Daimon Verlag, 
 C.G. Jung, Bild und Wort,1. Auflage 1977 Walter Verlag
  C.G. Jung, Briefe (Band I-III), 1. Auflage 1993 Patmos Verlag
 Der Mythus vom Sinn im Werk von C.G. Jung, 1. Auflage 1983, 4. Auflage 2010, Daimon Verlag, 
  Erinnerungen Träume und Gedanken von C.G. Jung, 1. Auflage Rascher Verlag 1969, 18. Auflage (korrigierte Sonderausgabe) 2013 Patmos Verlag,  
 Geistererscheinungen und Vorzeichen, 1. Auflage 1995, 4. Auflage 2008, Daimon Verlag, 
 Mystik und Grenzen der Erkenntnis, 1. Auflage 1988 Daimon Verlag, 
 Parapsychologie Individuation Nationalsozialismus Themen bei C.G. Jung, 1. Auflage 1985, Daimon Verlag, 
 Religiöser Wahn und schwarze Magie, d. trag. Leben d. Anna Kingsford (1846 - 1888)''. Neugestaltung d. 1980 im Bonz-Verl. erschienenen Bd. "Anna Kingsford, religiöser Wahn und Magie". Zürich: Daimon-Verl., 1986. .

See also

References

External links
 

1903 births
1991 deaths
Jungian psychologists 
Swiss psychoanalysts
Carl Jung
German emigrants to Switzerland